John Kevin Dixon is a New Zealand former rugby league footballer who represented New Zealand in the 1968 World Cup.

Early life
Dixon was born in Greymouth and was educated at, and first played rugby league for, Marist Brothers High School, Greymouth.

Playing career
A West Coast representative, Dixon made his debut for the New Zealand national rugby league team in 1965 in the second test match against Australia. He went on to play in ten test matches for New Zealand, including at the 1968 World Cup.

In 1971 Dixon moved to Sydney and played for the Cronulla-Sutherland Sharks in the NSWRL Premiership.

Coaching career
In 1991 Dixon coached Nelson against Marlborough.

References

Living people
New Zealand rugby league players
New Zealand national rugby league team players
West Coast rugby league team players
Cronulla-Sutherland Sharks players
New Zealand rugby league coaches
Rugby league second-rows
Marist (West Coast) players
Tasman rugby league team coaches
Year of birth missing (living people)
People educated at John Paul II High School, Greymouth